The World Women Pairs Championship is a bridge championship held every four years as part of the World Bridge Championships. It is restricted to women pairs only.

Results
World meets commonly run for 15 days on a schedule whose details vary.

In 2006 the Women Pairs played Saturday to Friday, the 8th to 14th days of the meet, with five qualifying sessions, five semifinal sessions, and four final sessions. At the start of qualifying, sixteen teams remained in the knockout stage of the marquee teams competition for women, for the McConnell Cup. During qualifying sessions for the pairs, the McConnell teams were reduced from sixteen to four, and players from the twelve "knocked out" teams were eligible to enter pairs competition at the semifinal stage. There were 109 pairs in the qualifier, 63 in the semifinal, and 36 in the final.

United States pairs have won ten of 14 tournaments through 2014, Great Britain two, Netherlands one, China one. Fritzi Gordon and Rixi Markus of Great Britain (native Austrians) are the only two-time champion pair; Americans Karen McCallum and Kerri Sanborn/Shuman also have two wins each including one as partners in 1990. Sanborn is also the only winner of two gold medals in the World Mixed Pairs Championship, which is contested at the same quadrennial meet.

See also
World Mixed Pairs Championship
World Open Pairs Championship

Notes

References

External links
 Women program top page at the World Bridge Federation
 World Women Pairs Championship 1962–present (table) at the World Bridge Federation 

Women Pairs
Quadrennial sporting events